A weedtuber (a portmanteau of the words weed and  YouTube) is a vlogger (an online video content creator) who deals with issues surrounding cannabis. Since cannabis legalization of the 2010s the producers/hosts sometimes consume cannabis on camera.

Popular weedtubers may have 300,000 or more channel subscribers. One (Joel Hradecky) has over one million as of early 2017. MassRoots listed 10 channels with over 100,000 subscribers in mid 2016. The term "weedtuber" began to appear on Google Trends in early 2015.

A sponsor  is reported to be willing to pay a channel with over 100,000 subscribers between $300 and $1000 for mentioning their product.

Legality
Some weedtube channels are produced where cannabis is illegal but tolerated, like Vancouver, British Columbia's Stephen Payne aka "Marijuana Man".

See also

Mukbang, content creators who eat for a video audience

References

Cannabis media
Lifestyle YouTubers
Internet terminology